Del Vecchio is an italian surname literally meaning "of the old man"  and may refer to:

People

Del vecchio or del Vecchio
 Domitilla Del Vecchio, Italian control theorist
 Emanuele Del Vecchio, a Brazilian football player
 Giorgio Del Vecchio, an Italian legal philosopher
 Giuditta del Vecchio, an Italian actress
 José Del Vecchio, a Venezuelan sports medicine specialist and youth baseball pioneer in his country
 Kenneth del Vecchio, an American politician and filmmaker
 Leonardo Del Vecchio (1935–2022), an Italian businessman

Delvecchio
 Alex Delvecchio, a Canadian ice hockey player
 Gennaro Delvecchio, an Italian football player
 Marco Delvecchio, an Italian football player
 Paul DelVecchio, a DJ better known as Pauly D, from the reality TV show Jersey Shore

Fictional characters
Al Delvecchio, from the TV series Happy Days, played by Al Molinaro
Dominick Delvecchio, from the TV series Delvecchio, played by Judd Hirsch
 Ozzy Delvecchio, from the TV series Bloodline, played by John Leguizamo 
Sly Delvecchio, from the film Passenger 57, played by Tom Sizemore
Tony Delvecchio, from the videogame series Backyard Sports

See also
Vecchio (surname)